The Division of Port Adelaide was an Australian electoral division in the state of South Australia. The 181 km² seat extended from St Kilda in the north to Grange Road and Findon in the south with part of Salisbury to the east. Suburbs included Alberton, Beverley, Birkenhead, Cheltenham, Findon, Kilkenny, Largs Bay, Mansfield Park, North Haven, Ottoway, Parafield Gardens, Paralowie, Pennington, Port Adelaide, Queenstown, Rosewater, Salisbury Downs, Semaphore, Woodville, West Croydon, and part of Seaton. The seat also included Torrens Island and Garden Island. Port Adelaide was abolished in 2019, after a redistribution triggered by a change in representation entitlement which saw South Australia's seats in the House of Representatives reduced to ten.

History

The seat was named after the suburb of Port Adelaide, the working port of Adelaide. Before 1949, most of the seat had been part of Hindmarsh, which moved south as a result of Port Adelaide's creation. The seat was proclaimed at the redistribution of 11 May 1949, and was first contested at the 1949 federal election. For most of its history, it has been a comfortably safe Labor seat. The closest Labor has ever come to losing it was at the 1988 by-election, where Labor candidate Rod Sawford won on a 5.2 percent two-party margin. The two-party margin currently stands, after the 2016 vote, at 20.72 percent, making it the safest Labor seat in the state and one of the safest Labor seats in the nation. Port Adelaide remains the only electorate in South Australia to have voted Labor at every federal election in its existence.

The seat was pushed slightly northward in 2004 with the abolition of the other safe Labor seat in northern Adelaide, Bonython. A few southern portions of Bonython transferred to Port Adelaide, however the majority of Bonython was transferred to Wakefield which contributed to Wakefield's change from a rural safe Liberal seat to a hybrid urban-rural notional marginal Labor seat.

A notable curiosity in recent years was that in the 1998 and 2001 federal elections, the seat was the only one in Australia where a Communist Party candidate, Michael Perth, stood for election. This was the only occasion when the Liberal Party did not preference the One Nation Party last. He achieved about one percent of the vote on each occasion.

Sawford retired at the 2007 election, which saw South Australian Labor's historically safe seat easily won by the newly endorsed Labor candidate, unionist and former head of the Left state Labor faction Mark Butler.

At the 2016 election, as a result of the emergence of the Nick Xenophon Team, Butler became the first Labor candidate in 20 years, and only the second ever, to come up short of a majority on the primary vote. He easily won after preferences, with NXT pushing the Liberals into third place. While Port Adelaide remains the safest Labor seat in South Australia on two-party terms, Butler's primary vote was actually one percent lower than that of Amanda Rishworth in Kingston. Despite also falling short of a majority on the primary vote, Rishworth received the highest primary vote of South Australia's 11 seats, but remained the second safest Labor seat in South Australia on two-party terms. The presence of NXT candidates in all eleven state seats resulted in a suppressed major party primary vote.

Due to a change in representation entitlements for South Australia, the Redistribution Committee of the Australian Electoral Commission proposed that Port Adelaide be abolished as part of the 2018 boundary redistribution. 

In July 2018, this recommendation was adopted, reducing the number of seats in South Australia to ten for the 2019 election. Most of Port Adelaide's electors will join Hindmarsh, which will change from marginal Labor to fairly safe Labor as a result. Smaller portions will transfer to Spence (formerly Wakefield), Adelaide and Makin. Ironically, most of the Port Adelaide area had been part of Hindmarsh for the first half-century after Federation. Butler transferred to Hindmarsh, while Hindmarsh's incumbent Labor MP, Steve Georganas, transferred to Adelaide.

Members

Election results

References
 ABC profile for Port Adelaide: 2016
 Poll Bludger profile for Port Adelaide: 2016
 AEC profile for Port Adelaide: 2016

Notes

External links
 SA boundary map, 2001: AEC
 SA boundary map, 1984: Atlas SA

Former electoral divisions of Australia
Constituencies established in 1949
Constituencies disestablished in 2019
1949 establishments in Australia
2019 disestablishments in Australia